Francis Christopher Staines (7 November 1876 – 12 August 1937) was an Australian rules footballer who played with Melbourne in the Victorian Football League (VFL).

Notes

External links 
	

1876 births
Australian rules footballers from Victoria (Australia)
Melbourne Football Club players
1937 deaths